Eskeldi District is a district of Jetisu Region in Kazakhstan. The administrative center of the district is the settlement of Karabulak. Population:

References

Districts of Kazakhstan
Almaty Region